is a railway station on the Kyudai Main Line in Yufu, Ōita Prefecture, Japan, operated by JR Kyushu.

Lines

Station layout
The station has two opposed side platforms serving two tracks with a siding. The platforms are connected by a footbridge. The station building is a modern steel frame structure which houses a waiting area, a staffed ticket window, an automatic ticket vending machine, a SUGOCA card charge machine and a SUGOCA card reader.

Management of the station has been outsourced to the JR Kyushu Tetsudou Eigyou Co., a wholly owned subsidiary of JR Kyushu specialising in station services. It staffs the ticket counter which is equipped with a POS machine but does not have a Midori no Madoguchi facility.

Adjacent stations

History
The Daito Railway was nationalized and absorbed into the Japanese Government Railways on 1 December 1922, and the reading of the station name was changed to "Mukainoharu" from this date, although the Japanese characters for the name remained unchanged. With the privatization of Japanese National Railways (JNR) on 1 April 1987, the station came under the control of JR Kyushu.

Passenger statistics
In fiscal 2016, the station was used by an average of 609 passengers daily (boarding passengers only), and it ranked 221st among the busiest stations of JR Kyushu.

Surrounding area
 National Route 210

See also
List of railway stations in Japan

References

External links
Mukainoharu (JR Kyushu)

Railway stations in Ōita Prefecture
Stations of Kyushu Railway Company
Railway stations in Japan opened in 1915